Alain van Lancker (born 15 May 1947) is a French former cyclist. He competed in the team pursuit at the 1968 Summer Olympics.

References

1947 births
Living people
French male cyclists
Olympic cyclists of France
Cyclists at the 1968 Summer Olympics
Cyclists from Paris
French track cyclists